The following is a list of people executed by the U.S. state of Vermont from 1778 to 1954.

Capital punishment was abolished in Vermont in 1972. From 1778-1954, 26 people were executed in Vermont, 21 by hanging and 5 by electrocution. 24 of the executions were of males, while 2 were of females.

Executions 1778-1954

See also
 Capital punishment in Vermont
 Capital punishment in the United States

References

People executed by Vermont
People executed
Vermont
executed